Christian Nummedal (born 3 November 1995) is a Norwegian freestyle skier. He competed in big air at Winter X Games XXII.

Nummedal competed in slopestyle at the FIS Freestyle Ski and Snowboarding World Championships 2017 and represented Norway in slopestyle at the 2018 Winter Olympics in PyeongChang.

References

External links
 
 
 
 
 

1995 births
Living people
X Games athletes
Norwegian male freestyle skiers
Freestyle skiers at the 2018 Winter Olympics
Freestyle skiers at the 2022 Winter Olympics
Olympic freestyle skiers of Norway